Frogger's Adventures: Temple of the Frog is a video game released in North America in 2001 for the Game Boy Advance.

Gameplay 
In this game, Frogger searches five worlds for four sacred elements needed to rescue his friends and save his swamp.  Lumpy, one of his friends, or someone else, will talk to him before every level to give him information.  He must face 15 levels and five bosses, including his final showdown with the evil Mr. D to recover the elements and save his swamp.

Sequels 
A title named Frogger's Adventures 2: The Lost Wand was released in 2002, also for Game Boy Advance. In 2003, another game titled Frogger's Adventures: The Rescue appeared for PlayStation 2, GameCube and Windows.

Reception 
Frogger's Adventures: Temple of the Frog received generally positive reviews.

In the United States, Temple of the Frog sold 1.7 million copies and earned $28 million by August 2006. During the period between January 2000 and August 2006, it was the 5th highest-selling game launched for the Game Boy Advance, Nintendo DS or PlayStation Portable in that country.

References 

2001 video games
Game Boy Advance games
Game Boy Advance-only games
Frogger
Platform games
Video games developed in China